The 1947 Kansas State Wildcats football team was an American football team that represented Kansas State University in the Big Six Conference during the 1947 college football season. In its first and only season under head coach Sam Francis, the team compiled a 0–10 record (0–5 against conference opponents), finished last in the Big Six, and was outscored by a total of 283 to 71. The team played its home games at Memorial Stadium in Manhattan, Kansas.

On September 20, 1947, Kansas State hosted the first night game held in a Big Six stadium.

Schedule

References

Kansas State
Kansas State Wildcats football seasons
College football winless seasons
Kansas State Wildcats football